The Dent de Vaulion is a mountain peak of the Swiss Jura, overlooking the lake of Joux and Vaulion in the canton of Vaud.

A small ski resort is located on its slopes. The municipality of Vallorbe is located on the mountain's foothills.

References

Mountains of Switzerland
Mountains of the canton of Vaud
Mountains of the Jura
One-thousanders of Switzerland